Gamanam may refer to:
 Gamanam (1994 film), directed by Sree Prakash
 Gamanam (2021 film), directed by Sujana Rao